Marie Sallé (1707–1756) was a French dancer and choreographer in the 18th century known for her expressive, dramatic performances rather than a series of "leaps and frolics" typical of ballet of her time.

Biography 
Marie Sallé was a prominent dancer and choreographer in early 18th-century dance. She helped to create ballet d'action (a form continued by her student, Jean-Georges Noverre); she challenged the male-dominated theatrical world; she reformed traditional "feminine" costumes. Born to fairground performers and tumblers in 1707, Marie grew up performing around France with her family.

She made her first public performance with her brother, Francis, at London’s Lincoln's Inn Fields Theatre in 1716. They made their Paris debut at the Saint Laurent fair in 1718 performing La Princesse Charisme, created by Véronique Lesage. In 1725, their family returned to England, but they stayed. The pair is said to have studied with Claude Balon, star of the Paris Opéra, as well as his partner, Françoise Prévost, and fellow dancer at Paris Opera, Michel Blondy. They spent two more seasons at Lincoln's Field Inn, performing dances from George Frideric Handel's opera Rinaldo as well as pantomimes.

Sallé went solo and started performing with the Paris Opera in late 1727. In her premiere, she performed in Jean-Joseph Mouret's Les Amours des Dieux. She danced alongside Marie Camargo, also a student of Prévost; however, they each formed different approaches to their dancing – Camargo as the technician and Sallé as the actress. Her legacy never quite separated from Camargo despite their differing styles. Sallé never settled in at the Paris Opera as she left three times after conflicts with the administration. Nevertheless, she left her mark there, especially during her collaboration with Jean-Philippe Rameau. She continued to London in 1734 for her fourth season. She was engaged by John Rich to perform at Covent Garden. She danced in "Terpsicore," a prologue to a revision of Handel's "Il pastor fido," and in the premieres of the same composer's "Alcina" and "Ariodante."

Also In 1734 she presented her first original, and almost famous work in 1734, Pygmalion, a mythological tale of a statue that comes to life and the sculptor who creates it. This piece made her the first woman to choreograph a ballet in which she also danced. In Pygmalion, Sallé chose to dress in Greek robes, wear her hair down and dance in sandals while playing the role of the statue in an attempt to make it a more realistic characterization. According to Susan Au, her choreography "gave the impression of a danced conversation" (Ballet and Modern Dance 32). During this season, Covent Garden also saw her pantomime Bacchus and Ariadne and her collaboration with Handel.

She returned to Paris in 1735 and choreographed and danced in scenes for Jean-Phillipe Rameau’s opéra-ballets. She retired from the public stage in 1741. However, she continued to dance at court (i.e. to the request of royalty for them and the nobility at court). She taught at the Opéra-Comique in 1743 and, according to her student Jean-Georges Noverre, she practised daily. Sallé came out of retirement for a few performances at Versailles between 1745-47.  She died on June 27, 1756.

Private life and public image
The theatrical scene in 18th-century London and Paris was male-dominated and unreceptive to change. It was the men who held the influential positions in courts and theaters, who were the artists, and women were only seen as able to interpret what the men had created. Marie Sallé, not only an expressive dancer but also a noteworthy choreographer, challenged these boundaries given to women. However, despite being one of the first women to stage and dance in her own original productions in London and Paris opera houses, her achievements received overwhelmingly negative feedback if any at all compared with her male counterparts. This disparity occurred mostly likely because – as Christine Battersby theorizes – male writers consciously excluded women from their definitions of creative potential. Sallé’s accomplishments in her early years were translated by the male-dominant theatre space into reflections of her virtuosity and proper femininity. She was often described as having a “virginal image,” earning her the nickname of “La Vestale,” referencing the vestal virgins of Rome who were the only women excused from having male guardianship. In fact, Nicholas Lancret, in 1732, painted a portrait of Sallé as the virgin goddess, Diana, further cementing Sallé’s public virtuous image in her early years. Images of the rose also followed her after her role in Jean-Philippe Rameau’s Les Indes Galantes in 1735.

In contrast, Sallé also gained a reputation of being highly sensual with a mysterious private life. In dancing, she was described as the goddess of Grace and Voluptuousness, but this alternate image clashed with one of virginity and virtuosity, creating this tension that critics and public spectators struggled to reconcile. As a result, Sallé’s pure public image began to deteriorate, replaced by one of sexual predilection and scandal. After Sallé’s return to Paris in 1735, rumors began to spread of an affair between her and Manon (Marie) Grognet, a dancer and colleague Sallé had met in London. At this time, Sallé was in her mid-thirties and had no heterosexual attachment, thus, the public speculated that colleagues of hers may have used her abstinence as a cover for her casual affairs. However, all rumors and publications on Sallé's sexual or romantic activity had no tangible evidence. Battersby theorizes that the controversial perception of her private life probably was related to the fact that, at the time, Sallé was experiencing success as a choreographer.

Sallé retired at the age of thirty-three. Interestingly, once removed from the public gaze, she disappeared from the writings of her contemporaries as well. What written documentation remained after her retirement alluded once again to the virginal image of her early years. In her later life, Sallé lived in "domestic contentment" with an Englishwoman, Rebecca Wick, whom she named as her "amiable amie" five years prior to her death, when bequeathing her estate to Wick as her sole heir.

Costume Reform

Although mainly a choreographer and performer, Sallé also laid the foundation for an influential new wave of costume reform in dance history spearheaded by her pupil, Jean-Georges Noverre, in the late 18th century. Sallé introduced audiences to the idea of the rejection of masked dancers and vouched for the importance of dance and performance to mimic real life, including the costumes. She argued that costumes should reflect and represent the character, a novel idea at the time. This engendered a sense of "realism" that had been largely ignored up to this point in the evolution of ballet and also allowed for greater physical freedom among the female dancers, unburdening them of the restrictions of unwieldy and elaborate clothing on stage. This ideology of rejecting masks and realism mimicry was quickly picked up by Noverre and emphasized in his later works such as Letters.

Unfortunately, Sallé’s costume innovations were seen as overly radical and were rejected by French critics of her time. The culture and bureaucracies of dance in France in the eighteenth century were restrictive, thus it was common for dancers to turn to courts elsewhere for freedom to develop personal expressions of art. London in particular attracted many budding dancers as their lack of state patronage directly contrasted with France’s strict bureaucracies regulating dance practices, and Sallé was one of these dancers. London audiences proved to be more accepting of innovation in dance, and Sallé’s pantomime acting abilities fit well within the liberal climate of London audiences. There, she was able to choreograph and perform in arguably her most famous production, Pygmalion. Sallé’s appearance on stage in her production without a pannier, or a skirt that was the typical expectation of women’s costumes in her time, roused shock from French contemporaries and critics, who were appalled that she dared appear on stage without a skirt, headdress, or even a corset. Despite this negative feedback, Sallé continued to push her desires for realism in costuming, presenting what Sarah McCleave describes as one of Sallé’s boldest costuming reform attempts in Handel’s Alcina. There, she performed in what the Abbé Prévost later labeled as “male attire” that went against the feminine image typical of dancers in the eighteenth century. Sallé changed the traditional costuming from heavy long dresses to muslin-flowing material which caused shock and delight. She often performed without a skirt or bodice (sans-paniers), rebelling against the traditional costume and accepted gender norms of a very regimented era.

Critiques of Sallé’s costume reforms ultimately returned to the strong patriarchal authority in the theatre sphere, where the dominant male voice imposed expectations of female grace and docility and criticized the female creators that strayed from this definition of femininity. Yet, Sallé was able to slowly gain respect for herself and her work despite the strong criticism by collaborating with influential composers such as George Frideric Handel and Christoph von Gluck, commissioning compositions from them for her choreography.

See also
 Women in dance

References

Further reading

 McCleave, Sarah. "Marie Sallé, a Wise Professional Woman of Influence” Women’s Work: Making Dance in Europe before 1800, Lynn Matluck Brooks (Ed.), University of Wisconsin Press, 2007, pp. 160– 181.
 Schmidt, Carl B. "Dance (opera)", Grove Music Online ed L. Macy (Accessed 3 April 2007), grovemusic.com, subscription access.
 Hogwood, Christopher. Handel (1988), Thames and Hudson, .
 Au, Susan.  Ballet and Modern Dance (1988), Thames and Hudson, .
 Ed. Selma Jeanne Cohen and Dance Perspectives Foundation. "The International Encyclopedia of Dance" (1998), Oxford University Press, published online: 2005, http://www.oxfordreference.com/view/10.1093/acref/9780195173697.001.0001/acref-9780195173697-e-1523?rskey=GQwkE4&result=1, Accessed October 22. 2017.
 Highfill, P. H., et al A Biographical Dictionary of Actors, Actresses, Musicians, Dancers, Managers & Other Stage Personnel in London, 1660-1800, Volume 13, by Philip H. Highfill, Kalman A. Burnim, and Edward A. Langhans; SIU Press, 1991, p. 184.

French ballerinas
1707 births
1756 deaths
18th-century French actresses
French stage actresses
Ballet choreographers
Sociétaires of the Comédie-Française
18th-century French ballet dancers
Salle
French women choreographers